The Sawtooth Complex fire was a group of wildfires in San Bernardino County in the U.S. state of California in the summer of 2006.  The Complex was made up of the Sawtooth, Waters, and Ridge fires, and burnt in chaparral two miles (3.2 km) east of Yucca Valley.

The Sawtooth Complex fire was started by lightning on July 9, 2006 at 8:30 am PDT.  The fire burned  and destroyed 50 homes, 8 mobile homes, 13 garages, 171 outbuildings, 191 cars and pick up trucks, 3 R.V.s, 27 trailers, 2 railcars, 9 tractors. 12 residences were damaged.  There were 17 minor injuries and 1 civilian fatality.

Residents of Pioneertown, Skyline Ranch, Pipes Canyon, Gamma Gulch, northern Morongo Valley, Burns Canyon and Rimrock were placed under mandatory evacuations.

Pioneertown is the site of several historic structures dating back to 1940s Hollywood film production.  While some buildings in Pioneertown were destroyed, the historic structures were spared.

At 5:00 pm PDT on July 14, the Sawtooth Complex fire merged with the Millard Complex fire.

The fire was 100% contained on July 18.

References

2006 California wildfires
Wildfires in San Bernardino County, California